Bolko II may refer to:

 Bolko II of Ziębice (1300–1341)
 Bolko II of Opole (before 1300–1356)
 Bolko II the Small (c. 1312–1368)